Vanitrochus tragema is a species of sea snail, a marine gastropod mollusk in the family Trochidae, the top snails.

Description
The size of the shell varies between 1.8 mm and 4 mm.

(Original description)This is a small conical chalky-white shell, colourless excepting for scattered transverse pink flames round the upper parts of the lower whorls just below the sutures. The shell is profoundly but narrowly umbilicate. The shell contains six whorls six, two being in the protoconch, slantingly angled in a gradate manner. The surface is closely acutely ribbed, the transverse decussations somewhat noticeable in the interstices, and these in some specimens give a crenulate appearance to the ribs themselves. The base 
is spirally costulate, as are the upper whorls. The aperture is round. The outer lip is simple.

Distribution
This marine species occurs off the Loyalty Islands, Tuvalu, and Australia (Queensland)

References

 Hedley, C. 1899. The Mollusca of Funafuti. Part 1. Gastropoda. Memoirs of the Australian Museum 3(7): 395-488
 Iredale, T. 1929. Queensland molluscan notes, No. 1. Memoirs of the Queensland Museum 9(3): 261-297, pls 30-31 
 Herbert, D. G. (1989). Pagodatrochus, a new genus for Minolia variabilis H. Adams, 1873 (Gastropoda: Trochidae. Journal of Molluscan Studies. 55: 365-372.
 Wilson, B. 1993. Australian Marine Shells. Prosobranch Gastropods. Kallaroo, Western Australia : Odyssey Publishing Vol. 1 408 p

External links
 To Encyclopedia of Life
 To World Register of Marine Species
 

tragema
Gastropods described in 1896